The name Boston Harbor may refer to:

Boston Harbor, a natural harbor located adjacent to the city of Boston, Massachusetts
Boston Harbor (horse), an American thoroughbred racehorse
Boston Harbor, Washington, an unincorporated community in Thurston County, Washington